The foveola is located within a region called the macula, a yellowish, cone photoreceptor filled portion of the human retina.  Approximately 0.35 mm in diameter, the foveola lies in the center of the fovea and contains only cone cells and a cone-shaped zone of Müller cells. In this region the cone receptors are found to be longer, slimmer, and more densely packed than anywhere else in the retina, thus allowing that region to have the potential to have the highest visual acuity in the eye.

The center of the foveola is sometimes referred to as the umbo, a small (150-200µm) center of the floor of the foveola; features elongated cones. The umbo is the observed point corresponding to the normal light reflex but not solely responsible for this light reflex. 

The anatomy of the foveola was recently reinvestigated.

Serial semithin and ultrathin sections, and focused ion beam (FIB) tomography were prepared from 32 foveolae from monkeys (Macaca fascicularis) and humans. Serial sections and FIB analysis were then used to construct 3D models of central Müller and photoreceptor cells.

It was discovered that in monkeys, outer segments of central foveolar cones are twice as long as those from parafoveal cones and do not run completely parallel to the incident light. Unique Müller cells are present in the central foveolae (area of 200 μm in diameter) of humans and monkeys.

Additional images

Notes 

Human eye anatomy
Visual system